PSR J0740+6620 is a neutron star in a binary system with a white dwarf, located 4,600 light years away in the Milky Way galaxy. It was discovered in 2019, by astronomers using the Green Bank Telescope in West Virginia, U.S., and confirmed as a rapidly rotating millisecond pulsar.

It is among the most massive neutron stars ever observed – with   placing it near the boundary of the theoretical maximum. Its mass was calculated via the Shapiro delay of its white dwarf companion as it passed edge-on to Earth.

PSR J0740+6620 is estimated to measure .

See also 
 PSR B1913+16
 PSR B1957+20 (1.66-2.4 )
 Neutron Star Interior Composition Explorer (NICER)
 List of the most massive neutron stars

References

External links
 

Pulsars
Neutron stars
Millisecond pulsars
White dwarfs
Binary stars
Astronomical objects discovered in 2019
Camelopardalis (constellation)